Epichorista is a genus of moths belonging to the subfamily Tortricinae of the family Tortricidae.

Species
Epichorista abdita Philpott, 1924
Epichorista aethocoma Meyrick, 1923
Epichorista allogama (Meyrick, 1914)
Epichorista armigera Diakonoff, 1956
 Epichorista aspistana (Meyrick, 1882)
Epichorista benevola Meyrick, 1920
Epichorista crypsidora (Meyrick, 1909)
Epichorista elephantina (Meyrick, 1885)
Epichorista emphanes (Meyrick, 1902)
Epichorista eribola (Meyrick, 1889)
Epichorista fraudulenta (Philpott, 1928)
Epichorista hemionana (Meyrick, 1883)
Epichorista lindsayi Philpott, 1928
Epichorista mesosceptra Meyrick, 1920
Epichorista mimica Philpott, 1930
Epichorista passaleuta Meyrick, 1920
Epichorista perversa Meyrick, 1912
Epichorista phaeocoma Meyrick, 1914
Epichorista prodigiosa Meyrick, 1920
Epichorista psoropis Meyrick, 1920
Epichorista samata Diakonoff, 1941
Epichorista sicca Meyrick, 1912
Epichorista siriana (Meyrick, 1881)
Epichorista tenebrosa Philpott, 1917
Epichorista zatrophana (Meyrick, 1883)

Former species
Epichorista cinerata Meyrick, 1920
Epichorista chloradelpha Meyrick, 1912
Epichorista exanimata Meyrick, 1920
Epichorista geraeas Meyrick, 1909
Epichorista niphosema Meyrick, 1917
Epichorista phalaraea Meyrick, 1920
Epichorista vestigialis Meyrick, 1914

See also
List of Tortricidae genera

References

 , 2005: World catalogue of insects volume 5 Tortricidae.
 , 1909, Ann. Transvaal Mus. 2: 5.

External links
tortricidae.com

Epichorista
Tortricidae genera